Wiesława Noskiewicz (13 July 1911 – 10 October 1991) was a Polish gymnast. She competed in the women's artistic team all-around event at the 1936 Summer Olympics.

References

External links
 

1911 births
1991 deaths
Polish female artistic gymnasts
Olympic gymnasts of Poland
Gymnasts at the 1936 Summer Olympics
Gymnasts from Warsaw